José Gerena Polanco is a Puerto Rican politician and the current mayor of Florida. Gerena is affiliated with the New Progressive Party (PNP) and has served as mayor since 2013. Has a BA in Human Resources from the University of Puerto Rico.

References

Living people
Mayors of places in Puerto Rico
New Progressive Party (Puerto Rico) politicians
People from Florida, Puerto Rico
University of Puerto Rico alumni
Year of birth missing (living people)